The Red Guards were a student mass paramilitary social movement that were first mobilized between 25 May and 2 June 1966 in China. Soon after meetings were held in order to facilitate the expansion of the Cultural Revolution in Tibet and in August 1966 students began to form the Tibetan branch of the Red Guards.

The Red Guards in Tibet 
On August 8, 1966, the decision was issued to start the Great Proletarian Cultural Revolution by the Central Committee of the Chinese Communist Party (CCP). The Red Guards were dispersed throughout China, at this time Tibet formed their own Red Guard in Lhasa.  This began the Cultural Revolutions destruction of Tibetan prayer flags, religious art, and sacred texts. In September 1966, Red Guards from Xianyang and Beijing began to arrive in Lhasa. These guards came from the Tibetan Nationality Institute and joined with local Red Guards to intensify the campaign against the "four olds" and class enemies.  Public "struggle sessions" were held by the Red Guards against "reactionaries" or "capitalists", in which people were beaten, and publicly shamed. Zhang Guohua and the Regional Party Committee wanted to minimize the Red Guards' access and criticism of the party leaders. On September 19, 1966, The Red Guards created and distributed big character posters that openly advocated the bombardment of the Regional Party Committee to many counties in Tibet. In November 1966 there was a citywide debate hosted by ten revolutionary organizations; this was to decide whether the Regional Party Committee had been "implementing a bourgeois reactionary line". This in turn divided Lhasa into two factions, both who claimed to be true followers of Mao Zedong, Gyenlo and Nyamdre. The State Council in Beijing once again gave instructions that banned the exchange of revolutionary experiences in Tibet, this was ignored. On December 4, 1966, the State Council announced regulations requiring the Red Guards, who were still in Lhasa, to leave Tibet and return to their own localities by December 20. Beijing Red Guards in Lhasa were given permission to stay by the Central Cultural Revolution Group, headed by, Jiang Qing. Red Guards ousted party leaders and took over their positions. In 1968, Mao sent People's Liberation Army troops into Tibet to gain control. This resulted in a series of public executions. In 1969, the People's Liberation Army disarmed the Red Guards all across China.

Birth of the Tibetan Red Guards 
From June 15 to July 5, 1966, the Regional Party Committee under the leadership of Zhang Guohua held meetings to decide how to implement the Cultural Revolution in Tibet. This meeting was used to figure out how the Regional Party Committee, not the local Red Guards or other revolutionary workers and cadres, could control the events to come. The solution to this was for the committee to decide among themselves who was to be sacrificed as a "capitalist roader" or reactionary. Those that were chosen were to be singled out and criticized by the masses. In August 1966 students and teachers at the Lhasa Middle School and the Tibetan Teacher's College began to organize their own Red Guard organization.

Beijing Red Guards 
In September 1966 Red Guards from  the Tibetan Nationality Institute in Xianyang  and Beijing began to arrive in Lhasa. Red Guards were encouraged to travel all over China to spread Mao's thinking and to ensure the "four olds" were being eradicated everywhere. With the arrival of the new Red Guards, the campaign against all thing capitalistic intensified. This began the power struggle between the Regional Party Committee and the Red Guards. Zhang Guohua was granted an order by Zhou Enlai to keep more Han Red Guards from Beijing and other areas from coming to Tibet. This order was ignored and in November 1966 three groups of metropolitan Red Guards arrived in Tibet. With the arrival of the new Red Guards the focus was directly on the party leaders.

Destroying the Four Olds 
Many temples in Tibet were destroyed prior to the Cultural Revolution. The temples and monasteries that were left became targets for the Red Guards. In September 1966, Jokhang Temple was destroyed. Red Guards used dynamite and artillery on many of these temples and monasteries, therefore reducing them to rubble. Libraries were also looted, and rare books, Buddhist scripture, and paintings were burned. This was done in private homes as well as the temples and monasteries. Monks could no longer wear their traditional robes but were made to wear blue Mao suits instead.

Gyenlo and Nyamdre 
Two factions were formed by the Red Guards in Tibet. These two factions each felt they were the true followers of Mao Zedong. The differences in these two factions steamed from whether the Regional Party Committee had been "implementing a bourgeois reactionary line" or the "proletarian revolutionary line". The Gyenlo faction published leaflets and publications that spelled out their commitment to rebel against the party leadership.  On December 28, in response of Gyenlo, mass organizations that were supportive of the Regional Party Committee joined together to establish the headquarters of Defending Mao Zedong's Thoughts or "Headquarters of Defending" for short. In February 1967, this became the Nyamdre. From May until December 1967 the disagreements between the two factions, Gyenlo and Nyamdre, escalated. The two factions fought armed battles in the streets of Lhasa.

References

Bibliography 

 Dreyer, J. (1968) 'China's Minority Nationalities in the Cultural Revolution', The China Quarterly, 35, pp. 96–109. doi: 10.1017/S0305741000032124.
 Mongolia, In. "Tibet." Persia and Afghanistan, in Caucasia and.
 Heaslet, Juliana Pennington. "The Red Guards: Instruments of Destruction in the Cultural Revolution." Asian Survey 12, no. 12 (1972): 1032–047. doi:10.2307/2643022.
 Barnett, Robert, and Shirin Akiner. Resistance and reform in Tibet. Motilal Banarsidass Published, 1996.
 Heath, John B. Tibet and China in the twenty-first century: non-violence versus state power. Saqi Books, 2005.
 Norbu, Dawa. Red star over Tibet. Sterling Publishers Pvt., Ltd., 1987.
 Smith, Warren W. "The nationalities policy of the Chinese Communist Party and the socialist transformation of Tibet." Resistance and Reform in Tibet (1994): 51–75.
 Sperling, Elliot. "Tibet and China: The interpretation of history since 1950." China Perspectives 3 (2009): 25.
 Yeh, Emily T. "Modernity, Memory And Agricultural Modernisation In Central Tibet, 1950–1980." Proceedings of the Tenth Seminar of the IATS, 2003. Volume 11: Tibetan Modernities. Brill, 2008.

Organizations in Cultural Revolution
Red Guards
1960s in Tibet